Taleh Mian (also Romanized as Taleh Mīān; also known as Talamaneh) is a village in Siahkalrud Rural District, Chaboksar District, Rudsar County, Gilan Province, Iran. At the 2006 census, its population was 20, in 5 families.

References 

Populated places in Rudsar County